
The following lists events that happened during 1848 in South Africa.

Events
 23 March - Approximately 163 German settlers, known as the Bergthiel Settlers, arrive in Natal.
 Voortrekkers settle across the Vaal River.
 29 August - Battle of Boomplaats is fought between the Voortrekkers and the British.
 The settlement of Zoutpansberg is established, which was later renamed Schoemansdal.
 The Reverend Isaac Hughes founded a mission station on the farm Backhouse, near the confluence of the Orange and Vaal rivers, which later developed into the town Douglas.

Deaths
 4 June - Christina Pretorius, wife of Voortrekker leader Andries Pretorius, dies near present-day Bela Bela
 23 November - Sir John Barrow, 1st Baronet, early explorer of Southern Africa, writer, and English Statesman, dies in London

References
See Years in South Africa for list of References

 
South Africa
Years in South Africa